Prarthana Gulabrao Thombare (born 18 June 1994) is an Indian tennis player. A doubles specialist, she is the former Indian number one in women's doubles, and an Olympian.

Thombare has won three singles and 25 doubles titles on the ITF Circuit. On 25 August 2014, she reached a career-high singles ranking of world No. 335. On 16 October 2017, she peaked at No. 125 in the WTA doubles rankings. 

Playing for India Fed Cup team, Thombare has a win–loss record of 13–8.

She won a bronze medal in women's doubles at the Asian Games, along with Sania Mirza.

Asian Games finals

Doubles: 1 (bronze medal)

ITF Circuit finals

Singles: 5 (3 titles, 2 runner–ups)

Doubles: 54 (25 titles, 29 runner–ups)

Notes

References

External links
 
 
 

1994 births
Sportswomen from Maharashtra
Racket sportspeople from Maharashtra
Tennis players at the 2014 Asian Games
Tennis players at the 2018 Asian Games
Asian Games medalists in tennis
Asian Games bronze medalists for India
Living people
Indian female tennis players
Olympic tennis players of India
Tennis players at the 2016 Summer Olympics
21st-century Indian women
21st-century Indian people
Medalists at the 2014 Asian Games
South Asian Games gold medalists for India
South Asian Games silver medalists for India
South Asian Games medalists in tennis